Neoascia meticulosa is a species of hoverfly.

Description
External images
For terms see Morphology of Diptera
Wing length 4.5–5 mm. Mouth edge protruding no more than a distance equal to 1/2 the horizontal diameter of an eye. Tibiae 1 and tibiae 2 yellow. Male abdomen black with yellow spots. Female abdomen broad and usually entirely black.
Barkemeyer & Claussen (1986)  figure the male genitalia. The larva is figured by Hartley (1961))    
See references for determination. 
 
 The male genitalia are illustrated by Barkemeyer and  Claussen (1986)

Distribution
Palearctic Fennoscandia South to North Spain, the Alps, Italy and Yugoslavia. Ireland East through North Europe and Central Europe into European Russia and the Caucasus. East through Siberia to Lake Baikal.

Biology
Habitat: Wetlands, fens, ponds and stream margins. 
Flowers visited include white umbellifers, Anemone nemorosa, Caltha, Cardamine, Ficaria verna, Galium, Prunus avium, Ranunculus, Salix, Sorbus aucuparia, Taraxacum.

The flight period is end April to June. The larva is aquatic and has found beneath the outer leaves of rotting Typha stems.

References

Diptera of Europe
Eristalinae
Insects described in 1763
Taxa named by Giovanni Antonio Scopoli